James Cullan "Hamish" Campbell-Rodger (25 June 1907 – 20 May 1968) was a cricketer who played first-class cricket for Rhodesia from 1924 to 1932.

Hamish Campbell-Rodger was born in Bulawayo and educated at Plumtree School, where he was head of school in 1925. His outstanding cricket season was 1931–32, when he captained Rhodesia to second place in the Currie Cup. He was their leading batsman with 385 runs at an average of 48.12, and took 10 wickets at 18.30. He scored his two first-class centuries that season: against Transvaal and Eastern Province. Rhodesia had never won a first-class match before the season, but went on to win four of their five matches, more than any other team in the competition, which they failed to win by only one point.

References

External links

Hamish Campbell-Rodger at CricketArchive

1907 births
1968 deaths
Sportspeople from Bulawayo
Rhodesia cricketers
Eastern Province cricketers